Father's Son is a 1931 American pre-Code melodrama film which was produced by Warner Bros. in 1930 and released early in 1931. The movie is based on the original film scenario Old Fathers and Young Sons by Booth Tarkington.  The film is also known by the name "Boy of Mine."

Leon Janney was being groomed as a child star by Warners, and this film was the one of several he starred in. His career, however, never took off, and in late 1931 he was released from his contract.

Cast
Leon Janney - Bill Emory
Lewis Stone - William Emory
Irene Rich - Ruth Emory
John Halliday - Dr. Franklin
Mickey Bennett - Junior Pettis
Robert Dandridge - Vestibule Pullman Porter
George H. Reed - Pullman Porter Johnson
Gertrude Howard - Dinah
Bertha Mann - Mrs. Stewart
Grover Ligon - Chauffeur (*Grover Liggon)

Preservation
The film is believed to be a lost film, with no film elements known to exist. The complete soundtrack, however, survives on Vitaphone disks.

See also
List of lost films

References

External links
 
 
 

1931 films
Lost American films
Warner Bros. films
1930s English-language films
Films based on works by Booth Tarkington
Films directed by William Beaudine
1931 drama films
American drama films
American black-and-white films
Films produced by Robert North
Melodrama films
1931 lost films
Lost drama films
1930s American films